Harry Sheezel is an Australian rules footballer who was selected with the third selection in the 2022 AFL national draft by North Melbourne in the Australian Football League.

Personal life 
Sheezel is heavily involved in the Jewish community (particularly in Melbourne). Sheezel became the first Jewish player drafted into the AFL since 1999 with North Melbourne's third overall pick at the 2022 NAB AFL Draft. Sheezel was the subject of antisemitic online abuse on social media after The Age published coverage of Sheezel and his predicted selection. Radio host Neil Mitchell called on the AFL to condemn the comments. Sheezel went to school and graduated from Mount Scopus Memorial College.

Football career 
Sheezel’s youth career started at AJAX Football Club he then moved to Sandringham Dragons for the final year of his youth. He currently represents North Melbourne in the AFL. Sheezel plays as a medium forward and been described as a "competitive, skilful, agile, clean, and driven" player. He considers himself "composed" and a "good decision-maker [with] good skills" with good goal sense. He was named in the Under 18 All-Australian team after kicking eight goals and averaging 15 disposals from four national championships. He also finished with the 36 goals in the 2022 NAB league season, the most in the league, including four or more in a game five times.

References 

Living people
2004 births
Australian Jews
Sportspeople from Melbourne
Australian rules footballers from Melbourne
Sandringham Dragons players
2022 Australian Football League season
Australian Football League draft
Jewish Australian sportspeople
North Melbourne Football Club players